Noradrenergic cell group A2 is a group of cells in the vicinity of the dorsal motor nucleus of the vagus nerve in the medulla that label for norepinephrine in primates and rodents.

References

External links
 BrainInfo

Norepinephrine